The Chao Phraya River flows through Central Thailand from the confluence of the Ping and Nan Rivers in Nakhon Sawan Province southward to its mouth in Samut Prakan Province, where it drains into the Gulf of Thailand. The river has long served as an important channel of water transport, although it was only after the opening of Rama VI Bridge in 1927 that a permanent land transport structure existed over the river. This page lists permanent crossings of the Chao Phraya, starting from the river mouth and continuing upstream to its source.

List

See also 
 List of crossings of the Ping River
 List of crossings of the Wang River
 List of crossings of the Yom River
 List of crossings of the Nan River

References

External links 

 Bridges over the Chao Phraya River 

Bridges in Thailand